Tandjouaré is a prefecture located in the Savanes Region of Togo. The cantons (or subdivisions) of Tandjouaré include Bogou, Bombouaka, Tamongou, Nandoga, Loko, Sissiak, Tampialime, Doukpergou, Goundoga, Lokpanou, Nano, Pligou, Boulogou, Mamproug, Bagou, Sangou.

References 

Prefectures of Togo
Savanes Region, Togo